De Leonism, also known as Marxism-De Leonism, is a Marxist tendency developed by Curaçaoan-American trade union organizer and Marxist theoretician Daniel De Leon. De Leon was an early leader of the first American socialist political party, the Socialist Labor Party of America (SLP). De Leon introduced the concept of Socialist Industrial Unionism.

According to De Leonist theory, militant industrial unions are the vehicle of class struggle. Industrial unions serving the interests of the proletariat (working class) will be the needed federal republican structure used to establish a socialist system.

While sharing some characteristics of anarcho-syndicalism (the management of workplaces through unions) and with the SLP being a member of the predominantly anarcho-syndicalist Industrial Workers of the World (IWW), De Leonism differs from it in that De Leonism, and its leading proponent, the modern SLP, still believe in the necessity of a political party, advocating a constitutional amendment making the union the government of industry. A general union would coordinate production and resource allocation between industries. The party would cease to exist, as would the state, as its goal. No vanguardist elites are provided with a base in Marxist-DeLeonism to scuttle the federal republic.

Tactics 
According to the De Leonist theory, workers would simultaneously form socialist industrial unions in the workplaces and a socialist political party that would organize in the political realm. Upon achieving sufficient support for a victory at the polls, the political party would be voted into office, giving the De Leonist program a mandate from the people. It is assumed that at that point, the socialist industrial unions will have attained sufficient strength in the workplaces for workers to take control of the means of production.

The De Leonist victory at the polls would be accompanied by a transfer of control of the factories, mines, farms, and other means of production to workers councils organized within the industrial unions. De Leonists distinguish this event from the general strike to take control of the workplaces advocated by anarcho-syndicalists and refer to it instead as a "general lockout of the ruling class".

The existing government would then be replaced with a government elected from within the socialist industrial unions, and the newly elected socialist government would quickly enact whatever constitutional amendments or other changes in the structure of government needed to bring this about, adjourning sine die. Workers on the shop floor would elect local shop floor committees needed to continue production and representatives to local and national councils representing their particular industry.

Workers would also elect representatives to a congress, called an All-Industrial Congress, which would effectively function as the government. These representatives would be subject to a recall vote at any time. De Leonism would thus reorganize the national government along industrial lines with representatives elected by industry.

Comparison to other forms of socialism 
De Leonism lies outside the Leninist tradition of communism. It predates Leninism as De Leonism's principles developed in the early 1890s, with De Leon assuming SLP leadership. Leninism and its idea of a vanguard party took shape after the 1902 publication of Lenin's What Is to Be Done? De Leonism is generally opposed to the policies of the former Soviet Union, China, and other socialist states and does not consider them socialist but rather state capitalist or following "bureaucratic state despotism". The decentralized nature of the proposed De Leonist government contrasts  the democratic centralism of Marxism–Leninism and what they see as the dictatorial nature of the Soviet Union.

The success of the De Leonist plan depends on achieving majority support among the people both in the workplace and at the polls, in contrast to the Leninist notion that a small vanguard party should lead the working class to carry out the revolution. De Leonism's stance against reformism means that it is referred to by the label "impossibilist", along with the Socialist Party of Great Britain.

De Leonist political parties have also been criticized for being allegedly overly dogmatic and sectarian. Despite their rejection of Leninism and vanguardism, De Leonism also lies outside the "democratic socialist" and "social democratic" traditions. De Leon and other De Leonist writers have issued frequent polemics against democratic socialist movements, especially the Socialist Party of America, and consider them reformist or "bourgeois socialist". De Leonists have traditionally refrained from any activity or alliances viewed by them as trying to reform capitalism. However, the Socialist Labor Party in De Leon's time was active during strikes and such, such as social justice movements, preferring instead to concentrate solely on the twin tasks of building support for a De Leonist political party and organizing socialist industrial unions.

Daniel De Leon proved hugely influential to other socialists outside the US. For example, in the UK, a Socialist Labour Party was formed. De Leon's approach has been described as a strategy that seeks to achieve a relatively "peaceful" or bloodless revolution. George Seldes quotes Lenin saying on the fifth anniversary of the revolution, "... What we have done in Russia is accept the De Leon interpretation of Marxism, that is what the Bolsheviks adopted in 1917."

Political parties 

 American Labor Party (1932)
 Industrial Union Party
 League for Socialist Reconstruction
 New Union Party
 Socialist Labor Party (Australia)
 Socialist Labour Party (Canada)
 Socialist Labour Party (UK, 1903)
 Socialist Labor Party of America
 Socialist Union Party

See also 
 Impossibilism
 Industrial Workers of the World

References

Bibliography

External links 
 DeLeonism.org
https://en.internationalism.org/tag/political-currents-and-reference/de-leonism

Eponymous political ideologies
Syndicalism
 
Daniel De Leon